EQB may refer to:
 Equitable Bank, a Canadian commercial bank
 Izz ad-Din al-Qassam Brigades, the military wing of Hamas
 Puerto Rico Environmental Quality Board
 Psalm 133, Ecce quam bonum
 Mercedes-Benz EQB, an electric sport utility vehicle